Ama Samy (Arul Maria Arokiasamy), S.J., born in 1936, is an Indian Zen master and Jesuit priest.

Biography
Ama Samy was born to Christian parents in Burma in 1936 and grew up in India. After becoming a Jesuit priest in 1972, he began visiting Hindu ashrams and Buddhist meditation centers. He was introduced to Ramana Maharshi's teachings by Swami Abhishiktananda. His searching led him to become a wandering beggar for a period and to settle down as a hermit. With the help of Father Hugo Enomiya-Lassalle, he visited Japan and trained with Yamada Koun Roshi of Sanbo Kyodan. In 1982, Yamada Roshi authorized him to teach Zen. He received the Japanese Dharma name Gen'un-ken (Gen: dark, obscure, mystery; Un: cloud).

Ama Samy founded the Bodhi Sangha, the community of his disciples, in 1986. Bodhi Sangha became an independent Zen school when he left the Sanbo Kyodan organization in 2002. Ama Samy's method of teaching embraces both Soto and Rinzai Zen traditions and draws from the resources of Christianity and other religions. He lives and teaches at Bodhi Zendo Zen Center near Kodaikanal in South India (opened in 1996). Since Father Lassalle first invited Ama Samy to join him on a tour to Europe in 1985, Ama Samy has spent several months each year leading retreats in Europe, Australia, and the US. With the help of his students, he also runs Little Flower, a non-profit organization supporting women, children and landless people in South India.

Dharma Successors
Ama Samy has appointed the following teachers:
 :de:Stefan Bauberger (b. 1960), Zen master, resides in Germany, separated from Bodhi Sangha in 2009
 Johannes Fischer (b. 1957), Zen master, resides in Germany, separated from Bodhi Sangha in 2018
 Carl Hooper (b. 1943), Zen master, resides in Australia
 Gert Lüderitz (b. 1950), Zen master, resides in Germany
 Mathew, Cyril Antony, SJ (b. 1970), Zen master, resides in India
 Angela Pliske (b. 1937), Sensei (Zen teacher), resides in Czech Republic
 Olaf Strelcyk (b. 1978), Zen master, resides in the United States

Books
In English:
 
 
 
 
 
 
 

In German:
 
 
 
 
 
 

In Dutch: 
 
 

In French:
 

In Spanish: 
 
 

In Swedish:

See also
Hakuun Yasutani Lineage Chart

References

External links
 "Zen and the art of compassion," documentary on Ama Samy by Pat van Boeckel (2016)
 Interview with John Cleary of ABC Radio Australia (2011)
 Reflections on interreligious dialog by Ama Samy (2010)

1936 births
Living people
20th-century Indian Jesuits